Male accessory gland infection (MAGI) is a condition with signs of inflammation involving one or more sites in the male genital tract. Diagnosis is made according to parameters defined by the World Health Organization, and it is particularly made in relation to infectious or inflammatory causes of male infertility.

Although it is usually caused by infection spreading from the urethra, non-infectious causes also exist.

Definition 
Along with testicles (orchitis), MAGI includes infections (bacterial, viral, fungal etc.) involving one or more of the following male genital organs or tracts:
 epididymis (epididymitis)
 vas deferens
 seminal vesicles (seminal vesiculitis)
 prostate gland (prostatitis)
 Cowper's glands
 urethra (urethritis)

Diagnosis 
As infection has a negative impact on the secretory function of the accessory glands, findings that could indicate the presence of MAGI include:
 signs of inflammation in a semen analysis (leukocytes ≥ 1x106/mL and/or elastase ≥ 230 ng/mL)
 low semen volume
 elevated semen pH
 low levels of alpha-glucosidase, fructose and zinc

WHO criteria 

MAGI can be diagnosed when there are two or more factors present that meet criteria defined by the World Health Organization (WHO):

Biomarkers 

One study has proposed that elevated levels of soluble urokinase-type plasminogen activator receptor (SuPAR) in seminal plasma might be useful as a marker for MAGI.

Causes 
The main infectious agents are Enterobacteriaceae (such as Escherichia coli and Klebsiella), Neisseria gonorrhoeae, and Chlamydia trachomatis.

One study has shown that men with MAGI who have lower serum levels of total testosterone tend to have a more complicated form of MAGI, such as involving more than one site, than those with normal levels.

Complications 
Potential complications include:
 obstruction of the epididymis
 impairment of spermatogenesis
 impairmentment of sperm function
 induction of sperm auto-antibodies
 dysfunctions of the male accessory glands

These complications can result in
sexual dysfunction and male subfertility.

References

External links 

Andrology
Inflammatory prostate disorders